Salamandrella tridactyla is a species of salamander in the family Hynobiidae.

References

tridactyla